Uche Iheruome (born April 14, 1987 in Lagos) is a Nigerian football player who played for Thanh Hóa.

References

Living people
1987 births
Nigerian footballers
Sportspeople from Lagos
Expatriate footballers in Uzbekistan
Expatriate footballers in Iran
Expatriate footballers in Latvia
Expatriate footballers in Vietnam
Nigerian expatriate footballers
Pakhtakor Tashkent FK players
Sanat Mes Kerman F.C. players
FC Shurtan Guzar players
SHB Da Nang FC players
Than Quang Ninh FC players
V.League 1 players
Association football forwards